Lemkein is a seamount in the Western Pacific Ocean, west of Kwajalein.

It is part of the Magellan Seamounts and is a volcanic seamount covered with sediments. Ferromanganese crusts occur in some places. Basalts in the form of pillow lavas altered to clay and zeoliths have been recovered from Lemkein.

References

Sources 

 

Seamounts of the Pacific Ocean
Landforms of the Marshall Islands
Extinct volcanoes